Lucy Clifford (2 August 1846 – 21 April 1929), better known as Mrs. W. K. Clifford, was an English novelist, playwright and journalist.

Biography 
Lucy Clifford was born Lucy Lane in London, the daughter of John Lane of Barbados. She married the mathematician and philosopher William Kingdon Clifford in 1875.

After his death in 1879, she earned a prominent place in English literary life as a novelist, and later as a dramatist. Her best-known story, Mrs. Keith's Crime (1885), centres  on euthanasia. It was followed by several other volumes, such as Aunt Anne (1892). She also wrote The Last Touches and Other Stories (1892) and Mere Stories  (1896), and several plays between 1898 and 1925. She is perhaps most often remembered as the author of The Anyhow Stories, Moral and Otherwise (1882), a collection of stories she had written for her own children. The best known of these stories is "The New Mother".

Lucy Clifford also wrote cinematic adaptations of her short stories and plays. At least two films were produced from these: The Likeness of the Night (1922), directed by Percy Nash, and Eve's Lover (1925), directed by Roy Del Ruth.

Her wide circle of literary friends included Henry James. She had two children. Her daughter Ethel Clifford (died 1959), later Lady Dilke as the wife of Sir Fisher Wentworth Dilke, 4th Baronet (1877–1944), was a published poet.

Lucy Clifford died in 1929, and was buried alongside her husband on the eastern side of Highgate Cemetery, London.

In 2004 Gowan Dawson described Lucy's efforts to uphold the reputation of Clifford after his death:
Clifford's disconsolate widow and two young daughters had been left totally unprovided for, and, notwithstanding a subsequent Testimonial Fund and Civil List pension, it was necessary for Lucy Clifford, who now owned the copyright of her late husband's works, to maximise the potential sales of his posthumous publications, not only by keeping Clifford in the public eye, but by ensuring that it was a generally positive (and thus marketable) portrayal of him that was presented.

Selected writings

References

Marysa Demoor (1999) "Self-Fashioning at the Turn of the Century: the discursive life of Lucy Clifford (1846–1929)", Journal of Victorian Culture, Volume 4, Issue 2, Spring 1999, pp. 276–291, 
Marysa Demoor (2001), "'Not with a bang but a whimper': Lucy Clifford's Correspondence, 1919–1929", The Cambridge Quarterly, Volume 30, Issue 3, 1 September 2001, pp. 233–256, 
Marysa Demoor and Monty Chisholm, (1999) "Bravest of women and finest of friends: Henry James's letters to Lucy Clifford". English Literary Studies, Scholarly Monograph Series, Victoria University Press; 1999, p. 120

External links
William and Lucy Clifford
Biography of Lucy Clifford by Monty Chisholm
A guide to the Mrs. W. K. Clifford Papers at the Beinecke Rare Book and Manuscript Library

Mrs W.K. Clifford on Great War Theatre website

1846 births
1929 deaths
English women novelists
English dramatists and playwrights
English women dramatists and playwrights
Burials at Highgate Cemetery